Juriga's Slovak People's Party was a political party in Slovakia. The party was founded in 1929 as a split from the Hlinka's Slovak People's Party. The leaders of Juriga's Slovak People's Party, Juriga and Tománek, had been expelled from Hlinka's Slovak People's Party in February 1929, as they opposed party leader Andrej Hlinka's support for Vojtech Tuka during his treason trial. The party published Slovenské l'udové Noviny as its organ.

Juriga's Slovak People's Party contested the 1929 Czechoslovak parliamentary election. The party ran candidates in three electoral districts. It failed to win any seats, obtaining 2,752 votes (1.27%) in Trnava electoral district, 691 votes (0.43%) in Báňská Bystrica electoral district and 1,952 votes (0.61%) in Nové Zámky 16th electoral district.

References

Political parties in Czechoslovakia
Political parties established in 1929